David Belda García (born March 18, 1983 in Cocentaina) is a Spanish professional cyclist, who last rode for UCI Continental team . In May 2017, Belda recorded a positive drugs test for erythropoietin (EPO) in an out-of-competition control. The following December, he was given a backdated four-year ban until November 2021.

Personal life
He is the son of Vicente Belda, who also competed professionally as a cyclist, winning stages at the Giro d'Italia and the Vuelta a España.

Major results

2005
 9th Overall Vuelta Ciclista a León
2008
 1st Aiztondo Klasica
 1st Memorial Valenciaga
 1st Vuelta a Zamora
 1st Stage 1 (TTT) Vuelta a Tenerife
 3rd Overall Vuelta Ciclista a León
2009
 1st  Overall Vuelta Ciclista a León
1st Stage 1
2010
 2nd Overall Cinturón a Mallorca
1st Stage 3
 4th Overall Vuelta Ciclista a León
1st Stage 3
2011
 1st Stage 2 Mi-Août Bretonne
 4th Overall Troféu Joaquim Agostinho
2013
 9th Overall Tour of Qinghai Lake
2014
 1st  Overall Vuelta a Castilla y León
1st Stage 2
 Volta a Portugal
1st Stages 3 & 5
 2nd Tour du Jura
 3rd Klasika Primavera
 6th Overall Vuelta Mexico Telmex
 6th Prueba Villafranca de Ordizia
2015
 1st  Overall Tour des Pays de Savoie
1st  Points classification
1st Stage 1
 1st Stage 4 Rhône-Alpes Isère Tour
 7th Prueba Villafranca de Ordizia
2016
 5th Prueba Villafranca de Ordizia
 9th Overall Tour of Austria
2017
 5th Trofeo Pollenca-Port de Andratx
 7th Trofeo Serra de Tramuntana

References

External links

1983 births
Living people
Spanish male cyclists
People from Cocentaina
Sportspeople from the Province of Alicante
Cyclists from the Valencian Community